This is a list of concert tours by Down with Webster.

Warped Tour 2009

Down with Webster played in Warped Tour 2009 throughout July and August 2009.

Cheap Date Tour
The band opened for Forever The Sickest Kids on select dates in the Cheap Date tour. Down with Webster opened for Forever The Sickest Kids on 9 of the dates across the United States from November 6 to November 15.

WINtour 2010

WINtour 2010 was Down with Websters first headlining tour. The band played 17 shows in the United States and Canada. The tour became part of the Shock Value II Tour when the band opened for Timbaland on two dates while on tour.

Tour dates

Canceled dates

January 20, 2010 - Indianapolis, United States
January 22, 2010 - Chicago, United States
January 23, 2010 - Green Bay, United States
January 24, 2010 - Madison, United States

Spring Tour 2010
In Spring Tour 2010, Down with Webster supported Cute Is What We Aim For along with The Friday Night Boys and The Bigger Lights. They played 35 shows in the United States, beginning on May 11 and ending on June 19.

Streets of Gold Tour
Down with Webster opened for 3OH!3 in October and November 2010 in the Streets of Gold Tour. The tour began on October 14 in San Antonio and ended on November 24 in Albuquerque, New Mexico.

WINtour 2011

WINtour 2011 is a tour by Down with Webster to support their album, Time to Win, Vol. 2. It began on February 22 in Lethbridge, Alberta and ended on March 12 in Toronto, Ontario. Sweet Thing and 2AM Club are opening for DWW on this tour. 2AM Club replaced New Politics who were going to open but had a change of plans.

Setlist
"Go Time"
"Time to Win"
"Bass"
"She's Dope"
"Rich Girl$"
"Ten"
"Big Wheels"
"Get Wrong"
"Staring at the Sun"
"Back Of My Hand"
"Heartbeat"
"Light The Night"
"G.T.F.O."
"Your Man"
"Whoa Is Me"

Tour dates

WINtour 2012

WINtour 2012 is a tour by Down with Webster. The band will tour across Canada in January 2011 and February 2011. Canadian musical duo Ubiquitous Synergy Seeker (USS) and OCD will open for Down with Webster.

Tour dates

The Warm Up Tour

The Warm Up Tour is a tour of the United States by Down with Webster. FreeSol was going to co-headline the tour but had to pull out due to scheduling issues.

Tour dates

Wintour IV: Party For Your Life

In January & February 2014, the openers were D-Pryde and Sonreal.  In September 2014, Dirty Radio performed at the shows in the Atlantic Canada region.

Tour dates

References

Down with Webster